The Electoral Fraud (Northern Ireland) Act 2002 (2002 c. 13) is an Act of the Parliament of the United Kingdom which reformed the electoral system in Northern Ireland. The act amended the Representation of the People Act 1983 by strengthening the requirements in the electoral registration process and requiring photographic identification at polling stations.

The Chief Electoral Officer for Northern Ireland is the returning officer and electoral registration officer for all of Northern Ireland, and runs the Electoral Office for Northern Ireland, which compiles the Electoral roll and manages all elections in Northern Ireland. In the rest of the United Kingdom, these functions are delegated by local authorities.

Under existing legalisation, the "head of household" was required to register all residents who were eligible to vote. The act changed the registration procedure, introducing Individual Electoral Registration, and requiring eligible voters to provide the Electoral Office for Northern Ireland with their signature, date of birth, National Insurance number and current residence. The act also required voters to present a photographic identity card at a polling station before casting a vote, with the Northern Ireland Electoral Identity Card created for voters without an acceptable form of ID.

Introduced to counter lack of public confidence in the electoral process in Northern Ireland, the Act was found to have improved public perceptions, and returning officers also reported a marked reduction in suspected incidences of voting fraud. In August 2002 the last register of electors compiled under the old system contained nearly 1.2 million names, while the first register under the new system, published in December 2002, contained fewer than 1.1 million names, losing some 120,000 names for a net reduction of 10%.

References

External links
 Electoral Fraud (Northern Ireland) Act 2002 at The National Archives

Electoral reform in Northern Ireland
Politics of Northern Ireland
United Kingdom Acts of Parliament 2002
Fraud in Northern Ireland
2002 in Northern Ireland
Acts of the Parliament of the United Kingdom concerning Northern Ireland
Election law in the United Kingdom
Elections in Northern Ireland
Criminal law of Northern Ireland
Fraud legislation
Electoral fraud in the United Kingdom